Last Tuesday was an American Christian punk band formed in 1999 in Harrisburg, Pennsylvania, United States. They played their final show on March 10, 2007. After the announcement from Steve Gee that he would be leaving the band, Last Tuesday no longer had any of its original members.

Discography 
Their last release, Become What You Believe, was very successful since its release on August 15, 2006. The new album showcased a heavier Last Tuesday, with more "screaming" from Carl, and heavier guitar riffs from Ben and Steve.

Their nationally released Mono Vs Stereo debut album, Resolve, was produced by Matthew Thiessen (lead singer of Relient K) and Joe Marlett (Blink 182, Foo Fighters).

Dear Jessica (LP-Dug Records) 2000
Composition (EP-Dug Records) 2002
Distractions and Convictions (LP-Dug Records) 2004
Resolve (LP-Mono Vs Stereo Records) 2005
Become What You Believe (LP-Mono vs Stereo Records) 2006

Members

Final line-up
Carl Brengle - Bass guitar, vocals
Ben Hannigan - Guitar, vocals
Chris "Tank" Murk - drums
Steve "Blade" Gee - Guitar, vocals (left the band in 2006 and did not take part of the final tour)

Former members
Steve Gee - Lead vocals, Guitar
Ryan "Deuce" Jernigan - Guitar
Bish - Guitar
Brett Algera - Guitar
Andy Culp - Guitar, vocals
Mike Hopper - Drums
Jim McConnell - Bass Guitar
Stephen Laubach - Guitar
John Russo - Drums

External links
Last Tuesday's Xanga

Musical quartets
Musical groups established in 1999
Musical groups disestablished in 2007
American Christian rock groups
Pop punk groups from Pennsylvania
Christian punk groups
1999 establishments in Pennsylvania